Natiruts Acústico no Rio de Janeiro is the second live album by the Brazilian Reggae band Natiruts. It features an acoustic performance taped at Mirante Dona Marta in Rio de Janeiro on February 1, 2012.

Track listing

Charts

Certifications

References

2012 live albums
Portuguese-language albums
Natiruts albums